Sepak Takraw at the 2007 Southeast Asian Games was held in the MCC Hall in The Mall Department Store in Nakhon Ratchasima, Thailand.

Powerhouse Malaysia withdrew their team just days before the commencement of the competition in protest against the use of a rubber-coated ball rather than the traditional rattan ball.

Medal table

Medalists

Men

Women

External links
Southeast Asian Games Official Results

Notes

2007 Southeast Asian Games events
2007